Santa Fe is a Japanese nude photo book published in 1991. It was modelled by Rie Miyazawa and photographed by Kishin Shinoyama. It was published with one image showing pubic hair without any kind of mosaic. It sold 1.5 million copies. Taken early in Miyazawa's career, it stunned Japanese society because the authorities had just begun to permit the publication of such kinds of "hair-nude" photographs.

The book was named after Santa Fe, New Mexico, where her photos were taken. Santa Fe, New Mexico's historic state capital, is also known as a city of arts.

After Miyazawa and Santa Fe, many Japanese women celebrities followed her in releasing "hair-nude" photo books.

Further reading 
 Allison, Anne.  Permitted and Prohibited Desires: Mothers, Comics, and Censorship in Japan.  Berkeley, California: University of California Press, 2000, pages 147–149.  .
 Schilling, Mark. The Encyclopedia of Japanese Pop Culture. s.v. "Miyazawa, Rie", pages 146–151. New York: Weatherhill, 1997.  .
 Shinoyama Kishin. Santa Fe.  Tokyo: Asahi Shuppansha, 1991. .

External links 
 PhotoGuide Japan's review of Santa Fe

Books of nude photography
Photography in Japan